Pods may refer to:

PODS (company), a moving and storage company based in Clearwater, Florida
Capsule hotel or hotel pods, small rooms for short stays at a  low price
James Podsiadly (born 1981), Australian footballer
Orthotube, a door-like security device seen in the BBC television series Spooks
Palm OS, Developer Suite
Pipeline Open Data Standard
Plain old data structure
Symposium on Principles of Database Systems, an ACM symposium started in 1982
pods, a Boston-based alternative rock band that included brothers Ben Deily and Jonno Deily
A common abbreviation in aquarism for copepods, a group of small crustaceans found in the sea and nearly every freshwater habitat
Personal online data store, a storage system for personal data through Solid (web decentralization project)

See also
Pod (disambiguation), including POD
The Pods, a leisure centre in Scunthorpe, England